These are the Official Charts Company's UK Independent Albums Chart number-one albums of 2014.

Chart history

See also
List of UK Dance Albums Chart number ones of 2014
List of UK Album Downloads Chart number ones of the 2010s
List of UK Independent Singles Chart number ones of 2014
List of UK R&B Albums Chart number ones of 2014
List of UK Independent Singles Chart number ones of 2014

References

External links
Independent Albums Top 40 at the Official Charts Company
UK Top 40 Indie Album Chart at BBC Radio 1

2014 in British music
United Kingdom Indie Albums
2014